This was the first edition of the tournament.

Anna Blinkova won the title, defeating Usue Maitane Arconada in the final, 6–4, 6–2.

Seeds
All seeds received a bye into the second round.

Draw

Finals

Top half

Section 1

Section 2

Bottom half

Section 3

Section 4

Qualifying

Seeds

Qualifiers

Draw

First qualifier

Second qualifier

References
Main Draw
Qualifying Draw

2019 WTA 125K series